The Tiger Brigades (French: Les Brigades du Tigre) is a period crime television series which originally ran between 1974 and 1983. Created by Claude Desailly it follows the activities of a police squad in the early twentieth century.

In 2006 a film Les Brigades du Tigre was released, inspired by the television series.

Main cast
 Jean-Claude Bouillon as  Commissaire Paul Valentin 
 Jean-Paul Tribout as  L'inspecteur Pujol
 Pierre Maguelon as L'inspecteur Terrasson
 François Maistre as Faivre, le patron
 Pinkas Braun as Gabrielli

References

Bibliography
 Christian Bosseno. Télévision française La saison 2010: Une analyse des programmes du 1er septembre 2008 au 31 août 2009. Editions L'Harmattan,  2010.

External links
 

1974 French television series debuts
1983 French television series endings
1970s crime television series
1980s crime television series
French-language television shows
French police procedural television series